Milutin is a Serbian masculine given name of Slavic origin. The name may refer to:

Stephen Uroš II Milutin of Serbia (1253–1321), king of Serbia
Milutin Bojić (1892–1917), poet
Milutin Ivković (1906–1943), footballer
Milutin Milanković (1879–1958), Serbian scientist
Milutin Mrkonjić (born 1942), politician
Milutin Šoškić (born 1937), former Serbian goalkeeper

See also
Milutinović
Milutinovac

Slavic masculine given names
Serbian masculine given names